Miraflores de la Sierra is a town and municipality in the northern area of the autonomous Community of Madrid, in central Spain, of c. 6,000 inhabitants, located 49 kilometers away from Madrid.

History
Miraflores de la Sierra, formerly known as Porquerizas was established by Segovian farmers in the thirteenth century. According to legend the town was renamed in 1627 by Elisabeth of Bourbon, wife of Philip IV of Spain. Walking to the monastery of Santa María de El Paular she saw the village of Porquerizas surrounded by blooming flowers, at which point she exclaimed Mira, ¡flores! ("look, flowers!").

Festivities
Beginning on 15  August Miraflores de la Sierra celebrates its festivities in honour of the Virgen de la Asunción. (Our Lady of the Assumption), patron of the municipality.

3 February, day of Saint Blaise, is also celebrated, as is 15 May, day of San Isidro.

Transport System 
The only way to arrive Miraflores de la Sierra in public transport is with bus line 725, which connects it to many other villages and Madrid. Formerly the village had a train station that connected it with Madrid, Burgos and Irún, but since 2011 the station is no longer in service.

References

External links
 
 Municipal website 
 A website from the citizens 
 Yet another website from the citizens 
 Miraflores citizen's forum 
 "Vecinos de Miraflores" Citizen social platform website with much information 

Municipalities in the Community of Madrid